Cary Joji Fukunaga (born July 10, 1977) is an American filmmaker. He is known for directing critically acclaimed films such as the thriller Sin nombre, the period drama Jane Eyre (2011), the war drama Beasts of No Nation and the 25th James Bond film, No Time to Die (2021). He also co-wrote the Stephen King adaptation It (2017). He was the first director of partial East Asian descent to win the Primetime Emmy Award for Outstanding Directing for a Drama Series, as the director and executive producer of the first season of the HBO series True Detective (2014). He also directed and executive produced the Netflix limited series Maniac (2018).

Early life 

Fukunaga was born on July 10, 1977 in Oakland, California. His father, Anthony Shuzo Fukunaga, was a third-generation Japanese American, born in an internment camp during World War II. His mother, Gretchen May Grufman, is Swedish-American and worked as a dental hygienist, and later as a college history instructor and university assistant professor of history. Fukunaga inherited his interest in history from her. His parents eventually divorced. His family often relocated within the San Francisco Bay Area, moving to Berkeley, Albany, Vallejo, Benicia, Sebastopol and back to Oakland.

Fukunaga attended Analy High School. He graduated from the University of California, Santa Cruz with a Bachelor of Arts in history in 1999 and attended the Grenoble Institute of Political Studies, where he studied geopolitics and international law.

Fukunaga had originally wanted to be a pro snowboarder, but switched to filmmaking in his mid-twenties. He got his start as a camera intern and later applied to film school. He enrolled in New York University Tisch School of the Arts Graduate Film Program.

Career

Short films 
Fukunaga wrote and directed the short film Victoria para Chino (2004) while at NYU, which screened at the Sundance Film Festival and received a Student Academy Award in 2005. It won an Audience Award for Best Narrative Student Short film at the 2004 Austin Film Festival, a Best Student Film award at the 2006 Ashland Independent Film Festival, a BAFTA/LA Award for Excellence – Honorable Mention award at the 2005 Aspen Shortsfest, Best Student Film at the 2005 BendFilm Festival, Best Short Film and an Audience Award for Best Short Film at the 2005 Gen Art Film Festival, Best Short film at the 2005 Milan International Film Festival, and the Jury Prize for Best Student Short at the 2004 Woodstock Film Festival.

Fukunaga wrote and directed the short films Kofi (2003) and Sleepwalking in the Rift (2012). He wrote and directed a segment in the omnibus film Chinatown Film Project (2009).

Feature films

Sin Nombre 
Fukunaga made his feature film debut with Sin Nombre, which he wrote and directed. It received positive reviews and a number of awards, including the Directing award at the 2009 Sundance Film Festival and a New Director's Award for Fukunaga at the 2009 Edinburgh International Film Festival. In 2009, it won Best Foreign Language Film awards from the Austin Film Critics Association, the Dallas-Fort Worth Film Critics Association Awards, the Florida Film Critics Circle Awards, the San Diego Film Critics Society Awards (2nd place for Best Foreign Language Film), and the Washington DC Area Film Critics Association Awards. Cinematographer Adriano Goldman won the Cinematography award at the 2009 Sundance Film Festival; and at the 2009 Stockholm Film Festival, the film won a Best Actor award for Edgar Flores, and Best Directorial Debut and FIPRESCI Prizes for Fukunaga. It also brought Fukunaga the 2010 Premios ACE award for Cinema – Best First Work.

The film was nominated for Best Feature, Best Director and Best Cinematography from the 2010 Independent Spirit Awards, and was nominated by the 2009 British Independent Film Awards (Best Foreign Film), the 2010 Broadcast Film Critics Association Awards (Best Foreign Language Film), the 2009 Chicago Film Critics Association Awards (Most Promising Filmmaker; Best Foreign Language Film), the 2010 Image Awards (Outstanding Foreign Motion Picture), the Bronze Horse at the 2009 Stockholm Film Festival and the 2009 Sundance Film Festival Grand Jury Prize.

Jane Eyre

In 2010, Fukunaga directed a new film adaptation of Jane Eyre starring Mia Wasikowska, Michael Fassbender, Jamie Bell and Judi Dench. It was released in 2011 and nominated for an Academy Award for Best Achievement in Costume Design for Michael O'Connor, and a 2012 Goya Award for Best European Film.

It was nominated for a 2012 BAFTA Award (Best Costume Design), a 2012 Broadcast Film Critics Association Award (Best Costume Design), the 2012 Costume Designers Guild Awards (Excellence in Period Film), the 2012 Evening Standard British Film Awards (Best Technical Achievement), the 2011 Phoenix Film Critics Society Awards (Best Costume Design), the 2011 Satellite Awards (Best Costume Design).

The 2012 Australian Film Institute awards as well as the 2011 British Independent Film Awards nominated Mia Wasikowska for a Best Actress award. Screenwriter Moira Buffini (as well as author Charlotte Brontë) were nominated for a 2012 USC Scripter Award.

Beasts of No Nation 
Fukunaga directed, wrote and filmed Beasts of No Nation, based on the novel of the same name by Uzodinma Iweala, in which Idris Elba stars as Commandant, a lead character. The movie was picked up by Netflix for a reported $12 million as part of an effort to expand into original films. On November 25, 2015, Fukunaga was nominated for the Independent Spirit Award for Best Director and Best Cinematography for his work on Beasts of No Nation, and the film received a nomination for Best Feature.

No Time to Die 
On September 20, 2018, it was announced that Fukunaga would direct the 25th James Bond film, replacing Danny Boyle. He is the first American filmmaker to direct an official Bond film for EON Productions. Fukunaga was originally considered to direct Spectre before Sam Mendes returned. The film, eventually titled No Time to Die, was co-written by Fukunaga alongside Neal Purvis and Robert Wade and Phoebe Waller-Bridge, and was eventually released in October 2021 in the United States.

Television 
Fukunaga directed all eight episodes of the first season of the 2014 HBO TV series True Detective, which was written and created by novelist and screenwriter Nic Pizzolatto. The series stars Matthew McConaughey, Woody Harrelson and Michelle Monaghan. Fukunaga served as an Executive Producer on the show. The series received critical praise and was nominated for five Primetime Emmy Awards, including Outstanding Drama Series and Outstanding Directing for Fukunaga, who won. For the second season of True Detective, Fukunaga did not return as director, but continued to serve as executive producer.

Fukunaga was originally slated to direct the 2018 TNT TV series The Alienist. However, due to scheduling conflicts he was replaced by Jakob Verbruggen, although he retained a "created by" credit and remained as an executive producer. Fukunaga served as executive producer for the follow-up series to The Alienist, The Angel of Darkness, based on the novel of the same name.

Fukunaga directed all ten episodes of the dark comedy series Maniac for Netflix. It premiered on September 21, 2018.

Writing and producing
Fukunaga has written most of the films he has directed. The short films that he has written the screenplays for include Kofi (2003) and Victoria para chino (2004). He wrote the screenplay to his feature film, Sin Nombre (2009), as well as his segment for the omnibus film, Chinatown Film Project (2009).

Through his production company, Parliament of Owls, Fukunaga has produced or served as executive producer on most of the projects he has directed. He was the executive producer for his short films Kofi (2003) and Victoria para chino (2004). He was an executive producer on Andrew Okpeaha MacLean's feature film thriller, On the Ice, which won "Best Debut Film" and the Crystal Bear (Best Feature Film for the Generation 14+) at the 2011 Berlin Film Festival, among other awards.

Fukunaga served as an executive producer for the HBO series he directed, True Detective. Warner Bros. chose Fukunaga to develop its adaptations of Stephen King's It (2017 and 2019), the first of which was initially due to start shooting in summer 2015. Fukunaga was set to direct the first film and was expected to co-write the second. Three weeks before production was slated to begin, Fukunaga left the project.

Cinematography and other work
Fukunaga served as a cinematographer on a number of short film projects, including Handmade (2013; documentary short directed by Rob Meyer), Sikumi (2008; also known as Sikumi (On the Ice) about an Inuit hunter on the frozen Arctic Ocean, directed by Andrew Okpeaha MacLean), Team Queen (2007) (a short film directed by Leah Meyerhoff), the feature documentary Death of Two Sons (2006; directed by Micah Schaffer), the short films Clear Water (2005; directed by Natalie Mooallem), White (2005; directed by Sebastian Mantilla), Kinnaq Nigaqtuqtuaq (2005; directed by Andrew Okpeaha MacLean), Two Men (2005) (directed by Ian Olds) and Mating Call (2004; directed by Patricio Serna).

He served as a camera operator on the short Glory at Sea (2008) (directed by Beasts of the Southern Wild director Benh Zeitlin), as a gaffer on the short film Just Make Believe (2008) (directed by Jadrien Steele), as an additional cinematographer on the TV documentary Small Steps: Creating the High School for Contemporary Arts (2007), assistant camera on the short film Dock (2004; directed by Nina Martinek), additional photography for the documentary Lockdown, USA (about the "War on Drugs" campaign and directed by Rebecca Chaiklin and Michael Skolnik), additional camera for Autumn's Eyes (2006; directed by Paola Mendoza and Gabriel Noble), a grip on the feature film Mango Kiss (2004; directed by Sascha Rice), and as an additional film loader on the feature film Black Cadillac (2003; directed by John Murlowski and starring Randy Quaid).

Following the 2022 Russian invasion of Ukraine Fukunaga is documenting humanitarian relief efforts in Ukraine.

Future projects 
In February 2017, it was reported Fukunaga was in talks to direct Shockwave, a drama about the lead-up to the dropping of the atomic bomb on Hiroshima. In March 2021, he signed on to direct and produce Tokyo Ghost, based on the science fiction comic book series of the same name.

Since May 2016, it was reported that Fukunaga, alongside Spielberg, could finalize the long-sought epic film about Napoleon that Stanley Kubrick worked on until the last days of his life. In September 2018, Fukunaga confirmed the reports, saying that he is already working with HBO on the film. In the same interview he said he was working on a project based on a book written by Alexandre Dumas.

Personal life 
Fukunaga lives in New York City. He has lived in France, Japan, Mexico City and London, and is fluent in English, French and Spanish. He considers screenwriter Naomi Foner as a mentor.

Misconduct allegations
In October 2021, Raeden Greer accused Fukunaga of pressuring her into doing a topless scene for True Detective that was not included in her contract.

In April and May 2022, three women accused Fukunaga of various forms of sexual harassment.

Actress and skateboarder Rachelle Vinberg posted videos to Instagram accusing Fukunaga of grooming her and many other young actresses, citing in particular her experience filming his "A Perfect Day" Samsung commercial in 2016 (when she was 18 years old), and said that she had been in therapy for a year and diagnosed with PTSD as a result of his behavior. On May 5, 2022, twins Hannah and Cailin Loesch, who worked on Maniac, accused Fukunaga of sexual harassment and grooming.

On May 31, 2022, Rolling Stone reported allegations by "nearly a dozen sources" that Fukunaga pursued younger women on set.

Filmography

Film

Executive producer
 On the Ice (2011)
 Little Boxes (2016)
 Thumper (2017)

Short films 

 As cinematographer only

Television

Awards and nominations

Notes

References

External links 
 

American cinematographers
American film directors of Japanese descent
American people of Swedish descent
American male screenwriters
American male television writers
American television directors
American writers of Japanese descent
Film directors from California
Film producers from California
Living people
People from the San Francisco Bay Area
Primetime Emmy Award winners
Princess Grace Awards winners
Sundance Film Festival award winners
Television producers from California
Tisch School of the Arts alumni
University of California, Santa Cruz alumni
Writers from Oakland, California
Screenwriters from California
1977 births